The Falconer is a 2021 Omani adventure drama film written and directed by Adam Sjöberg and Seanne Winslow and starring Rami Zahar and Rupert Fennessy.

Plot
Tariq and Cai are two best friends who work at a zoo. Their friendship deteriorates when Tariq decides to sell animals to the smugglers on whose money he plans to save his sister from an abusive marriage.

Cast
 Rami Zahar as Tariq
 Rupert Fennessy as Cai
 Khamis al-Rawahi as Mohammed
 Noor al-Huda as Alia
 Fouad al-Hinai as Ahmed
 Abu Jinah as Abu Jinah
 Amjad Meer as Faris
 Fatma Mirza as Tutu
 Hilal al-Jabri as Hilal
 Raid al-Amari as Mo

Reception
On Rotten Tomatoes, the film has an approval rating of 100 percent based on reviews from 5 critics, with an average rating of 7.3/10.

Angie Han of The Hollywood Reporter wrote "A thoughtful, if overly restrained, exploration of cultural differences between two friends".

Ali Arkani of Film Threat called it "a relatable experience where compassion and trust become the universal language of the cosmos".

References

External links
 

2020s adventure drama films